Windows 8.x refers to the following versions of Microsoft Windows and Windows Server operating systems:

 Windows 8
 Windows 8.1
 Windows RT
 Windows Server 2012/R2

See also
 Windows Phone 8.x

8.